Stand by Me may refer to:

Film and television 
 Stand by Me (film), a 1986 American drama film directed by Rob Reiner, based on the novella The Body by Stephen King
 Stand by Me (TV series), a 1998 Singaporean Mandarin drama series
 Stand by Me Doraemon, a 2014 Japanese 3D CGI-animated film based on the manga series Doraemon by Fujiko Fujio
 "Stand by Me" (Grey's Anatomy), a television episode
 "Stand by Me" (My Little Pony Tales), a television episode

Literature
Stand by Me, a 2010 novel by Sheila O'Flanagan
Stand by Me, an autobiography by John Kirwan

Music

Albums
 Stand by Me (Ernest Tubb album), 1966
 Stand by Me (Whatcha See Is Whatcha Get), by Bernard Purdie, 1971
 Stand by Me: The Ultimate Collection, by Ben E. King, 1987
 Stand by Me, by Ernie Haase & Signature Sound, 2002
 Stand by Me, by Ray Brown Jr., 2007
 Stand by Me, by the Kingdom Choir, 2018

Songs
 "Stand by Me" (Atomic Rooster song), 1972
 "Stand by Me", a 1972 song recorded by Golden Earring
 "Stand by Me" (Ben E. King song), 1961
 "Stand by Me" (The Brilliant Green song), 2007
 "Stand by Me" (Charles Albert Tindley song), 1905
 "Stand by Me" (John Newman song), 2020
 "Stand by Me" (Oasis song), 1997
 "Stand by Me" (Shayne Ward song), 2006
 "Train in Vain" ("Train in Vain (Stand by Me)" in the US), by the Clash, 1980
 "Stand by Me", by SHINee from the Boys Over Flowers soundtrack, 2009

See also
 Stand By (disambiguation)